Georges Marie Julien Girardot (1856–1914) was a French figure, landscape, and marine painter.

Life 

Georges Marie Julien Girardot was born in Besançon, Doubs on 4 August 1856. He was trained by the artist Albert Maignan in Paris.

Girardot was active in Paris, painting mostly genre paintings, female nudes, and landscapes. From 1882 he showed his works in the  Salon des Artistes Français. He was awarded an honourable mention in 1893 for The Hunt, a third-class medal in 1896 for Sermon and Miracles of St. Maximin, and a second-class medal in 1907 for Les Dieux s'en vont ('The Gods are Leaving'). He was a full member of the Société des Artistes Français from 1883 until his death. From 1907 he was also an associate member of the Académie des sciences, belles-lettres et arts de Besançon et de Franche-Comté.

He died in Paris on 21 April 1914, aged 57.

Collections 

 Gray, Musée Baron-Martin: Le gui sacré ('The Sacred Mistletoe').

Notes

References 

 Oliver, Valerie Cassel, ed. (2011). "Girardot, Georges Marie Julien". In Benezit Dictionary of Artists. Oxford Art Online.
 Stolpe, Elmar (2021). "Girardot, Georges Marie Julien". In Andreas Beyer, Bénédicte Savoy and Wolf Tegethoff (eds.). Allgemeines Künstlerlexikon. De Gruyter.
 Thieme, Ulrich and Willis, Fred. C., eds. (1921). "Girardot, Georges Marie Julien". In Allgemeines Lexikon der Bildenden Künstler von der Antike bis zur Gegenwart. Vol. 14: Giddens—Gress. Leipzig: E. A. Seemann. p. 172.

External links 

 Tree, Amber (2021). "Girardot, Georges Marie Julien 1856-1914". Flickr. Retrieved 23 April 2022.
 "Girardot Georges M. J.". La Conchiglia di Venere. (26 January 2017). Retrieved 23 April 2022.
 "Avant le Mariage (Before the Wedding)". Jan's & Company Inc. (2016). Retrieved 23 April 2022.

1856 births
1914 deaths
19th-century French painters